NGC 6027c is a barred spiral galaxy that is part of Seyfert's Sextet, a compact group of galaxies, which is located in the constellation Serpens.

See also 
 NGC 6027
 NGC 6027a
 NGC 6027b
 NGC 6027d
 NGC 6027e
 Seyfert's Sextet

References

External links 
 HubbleSite NewsCenter: Pictures and description

Serpens (constellation)
Barred spiral galaxies
6027c
56578
10116 NED04